Bumetopia brevicornis is a species of beetle in the family Cerambycidae. It was described by Hiroshi Makihara in 1978. It is known from Japan.

References

Homonoeini
Beetles described in 1978